The 1882 Alabama gubernatorial election took place on August 7, 1882, in order to elect the governor of Alabama.

Results

References

1882
gubernatorial
Alabama
August 1882 events